Abbasabad (also Romanized as ‘Abbāsābād) is a village in Azari Rural District, in the Central District of Esfarayen County, North Khorasan Province, Iran. At the 2006 census, its population was 479, in 108 families.

References 

Populated places in Esfarayen County